Two ships of the Royal Navy have been named HMS Walney after Walney Island off the coast of Barrow-in-Furness, Cumbria:

  was a  sloop launched in 1930 as USCGC Sebago. She was transferred to the Royal Navy in 1941 and was lost in 1942.

Royal Navy ship names